Alex Bayouth (January 25, 1926 – October 14, 2022), known professionally as Ted White, was an American stuntman and actor who was best known for playing Jason Voorhees in Friday the 13th: The Final Chapter. He was also notable for having doubled for John Wayne, Fess Parker, Clark Gable, and Richard Boone.

Life and career
Born as Alex Bayouth in Krebs, Oklahoma, White grew up in Snyder, Texas. He played football for the University of Oklahoma, then pursued a stuntman/acting career. In Sands of Iwo Jima (1949), White was approached because of his Marine Corps background when they needed a consultant for the layout of the island. That was when White met John Wayne and began doubling for him in 1952.

White had minor roles in several western films and in such television series as Daniel Boone; The Andy Griffith Show; Hunter; Magnum, P.I.; and The Rockford Files, usually in tough-guy roles such as police officers or hired thugs. He has also worked in Gone in 60 Seconds, Silverado, Major League, Starman, and Tron.

In 1984, White played hockey masked murderer Jason Voorhees in Friday the 13th: The Final Chapter, after the director needed a large man for the part. White reluctantly accepted because he needed the money. White asked not to be credited on screen for his part, partly because he did not appreciate how the young actors and actresses had been treated during production. He was later credited for the archive footage of him as Jason that was used in the seventh Friday film. White was offered the role of Jason for Friday the 13th: A New Beginning and Friday the 13th Part VI: Jason Lives, but turned them down. The roles ultimately went to stuntmen Tom Morga and C. J. Graham, respectively.

White died at his home on October 14, 2022, at the age of 96.

Partial filmography

Actor

Stuntman

References

External links
Official website

1926 births
2022 deaths
People from Pittsburg County, Oklahoma
People from Snyder, Texas
Male actors from Texas
Military personnel from Texas
Oklahoma Sooners football players
American male film actors
American stunt performers
United States Marine Corps personnel of World War II